John Knox (1758–1800) was a British Army officer. He was the son of Thomas Knox, 1st Viscount Northland and Anne Vesey, daughter of John Vesey, 1st Baron Knapton.

He served as Member of the Parliament of Ireland for Killybegs from 1777 to 1783 and for Dungannon from 1790 to 1794.

He commanded the Dungannon District in 1797 and 1798 and raised a unit of Yeomanry there.

He was commissioned lieutenant colonel of the 36th Regiment of Foot on 1 August 1795 and received the army rank of full colonel on the 21st of that month. On 6 September 1795 he received the local rank of brigadier general (West Indies). He was made major general on 18 June 1798. On 7 November 1799, he was made colonel commandant of the 9th Regiment of Foot.

In 1799 he took part in the Duke of York's expedition to the Netherlands. He served as commander of the Advance Guard, an elite brigade composed of grenadiers and light infantry. He negotiated and signed, as British representative, the Convention of Alkmaar that ended that campaign.

He was then appointed Governor of Jamaica, but drowned while travelling to the island in 1800.

References

1758 births
1800 deaths
Members of the Parliament of Ireland (pre-1801) for County Donegal constituencies
Members of the Parliament of Ireland (pre-1801) for County Tyrone constituencies
Irish MPs 1776–1783
Irish MPs 1790–1797
36th Regiment of Foot officers